Three athletes (two men and one woman) from Tunisia competed at the 1996 Summer Paralympics in Atlanta, United States. The silver medals were won in athletics.

Medallists

See also
Tunisia at the Paralympics
Tunisia at the 1996 Summer Olympics

References 

Nations at the 1996 Summer Paralympics
1996
Summer Paralympics